Justice in Northwest is a 2018 Chinese crime film written and directed by Huang Huang and stars Yu Nan and Simon Yam. The film premiered in China on 13 April 2018. It follows the story of a female policewoman named Gao Qiao in the detection of a cross border smuggling case.

Cast
 Yu Nan as Gao Qiao, a policewoman
 Simon Yam as Lu Hong, a former university chemistry professor
 Gao Jie (Jack Kao) as Lao Jiang
 Samuel Pang 
 Xie Xintong as Xiao Bai
 Li Zhuoyuan as Huotou
 Yang Shuming as Zhou Xiang
 Yang Shao'ang as Da Chun
 Zhang Shaoxuan as Xiao Chun
 Wang Yanhui as You Yong
 Peng Jingci as You Xiong
 Wang Xiaolong as Lai Ji
 Liu Wenhao as Waiter
 Chen Guanyu as Feng
 Lin Xiaofan as Sun Xiaohu
 Du Yuming as Drug dealer boss
 Lu Ling as Drug dealer OL

Production
This film was shot in both cities of Lanzhou and Baiyin in northwest China's Gansu province.

Release
The film premiered in China on April 13, 2018.

The film received mainly negative reviews.

References

External links
 
 

2018 films
2010s Mandarin-language films
Chinese crime films
Films set in Gansu
Films shot in Gansu
2018 crime films